Meghrig Parikian (Armenian: Մեղրիկ Բարիքեան) (3 January 1968 – 16 January 2021) was an Armenian bishop who served in the Armenian Apostolic Church under the jurisdiction of the Holy See of Cilicia. Parikian was the Dean of the Armenian Theological Seminary in Bikfaya, Lebanon. Meghrig Parikian was also a musician and composer who had studied at Juilliard and the Mannes School of Music in New York.

Priesthood
Parikian was appointed the parish priest of St. Mary Armenian Apostolic Church in Toronto in 2002. In 2014 he was ordained as a bishop, and then elected as Prelate of the Armenian Prelacy of Canada by the lay council on May 10, 2014.

Death
Parikian died of COVID-19 on January 16, 2021. His final unction was held on January 17, 2021, at St. Gregory the Illuminator Armenian Cathedral in Antelias, Lebanon. He was buried in the Holy See of Cilicia Brotherhood Cemetery in the Catholicosate of Cilicia.

References

1968 births
2021 deaths
People from Beirut
Bishops of the Armenian Apostolic Church
Lebanese people of Armenian descent
Deaths from the COVID-19 pandemic in Lebanon